Songal village is located in Kaithal Tehsil of Kaithal district in Haryana, India. As per 2009 stats, Songal village is also a gram panchayat.

Demographics
Most of the population of the village is Hindu and widely spoken language is Haryanvi.

Schools
 Govt. Sr. Secondary School.

Transportation
The nearby Railway stations to Songal village are New Kaithal Halt Railway station (NKLE) and Kaithal Railway station (KLE).

From Kaithal bus stand, bus services are also available to Delhi, Hisar, Chandigarh, Jammu and many other places. For Inter-state travel HR buses are also available from nearby town Rajound.

References 

Villages in Kaithal district